The 2009–10 season is the Cornish Pirates 7th season in the second tier of the English rugby union league system, the RFU Championship and their first in the British and Irish Cup. The Pirates finished 6th in Stage One of the Championship, allowing them to qualify for the promotion stages, where they finished 3rd and did not qualify for the semi–finals. They also won the final of the British and Irish Cup beating Munster A 23–14.

Pre–season Friendlies

RFU Championship

Stage one matches
Stage one is a league programme of 22 matches starting on Saturday 6 September 2009 and completed by Saturday 13 March 2010 (originally due to finish by Saturday 25 February). Each team play 11 matches at home and 11 away with the top eight teams qualifying for the promotion play–offs and bottom four play in the relegation play–off.

Stage one league table

Stage two matches

Stage two league table

British and Irish Cup

Semi–final

Final

See also

 2009–10 RFU Championship
 2009–10 British and Irish Cup
 2009–10 British and Irish Cup pool stage

References

External links
Cornish Pirates
Cornish Pirates unofficial fans site
Cornish Rugby

Cornish Pirates seasons
Cornish Pirates
Cornish Pirates
Cornish Pirates